Hypochrysops byzos, the yellow-spot jewel, is a member of the family Lycaenidae. Its range consist of eastern Australia. The wingspan of both the male and female is about 3 cm.

References

Luciini